Semtex is the debut studio album by Matt Elliott, released under the moniker The Third Eye Foundation. It was originally released on Linda's Strange Vacation in 1996.

The album was recorded on a 4-track recorder. Along with a mix of guitars, drum machines and noise samples, it features the voice of Debbie Parsons.

In 2015, Fact placed it at number 22 on their "50 Best Trip-Hop Albums of All Time" list.

Track listing

References

External links
 

1996 debut albums
Matt Elliott (musician) albums
Domino Recording Company albums